Herbal Turkey Breast is an album by the American saxophonist Karl Denson, released in 1993. It is an album of acoustic jazz.

Critical reception

AllMusic wrote that "Denson opts for an expanded musical palette, utilizing sax, trumpet, piano, bass, drums and percussion."

Track listing
Dinosaurs (Denson) 7:53
"D" as in David (Denson) 6:53
Shuff Mountain (Denson) 6:28
Crown Jewels Suite (Denson) 16:49
Yusef 28 (Denson) 10:28
Goodbye Pork Pie Hat (Denson, Mingus) 2:51

References

1993 albums